The black roughneck monitor (Varanus rudicollis) is a species of monitor lizard found in Southeast Asian countries of Thailand, Burma, and Malaysia. It is also found in Indonesia on Sumatra and islands of the Riau Archipelago  It is sometimes known simply as the roughneck monitor. In Thailand is called h̄èā cĥāng ("elephant bark").

The habitat of Varanus rudicollis is limited to primary and secondary rainforest and mangrove swamps. In the wild the black roughneck monitor is very rarely seen, but whether this is because of its rarity or its very secretive behavior is uncertain. They are often kept successfully in captivity, but have a shy disposition.

Description

The black roughneck is a medium to large monitor. It usually reaches an average adult size of 3–4 ft. The black rough-necked monitor can be easily recognized by large pointed scales adorning the necks of adults. They are a gracile, long-bodied lizard with a prominently pointed snout. There are two species known as roughnecked monitors, black roughnecks and brown roughnecks. The black roughnecks, when young, have various markings to better camouflage amongst leaf litter. As they age, the colors fade into primarily black or dark gray. They are arboreal, diurnal and feed on mainly insects as well as frogs, small mammals, reptiles and fish. The brown roughneck, also called the Dumeril's monitor is in comparison a specialized shellfish feeder. They have similar markings to black roughnecks when young, but when older fade to a brown color, as their name implies. Both black and brown roughnecks are known for their very calm temperament, rarely biting or tail whipping in captivity. When threatened they prefer to escape, urinate or defecate, puff up their throats or “go necrotic” by closing their eyes as if playing dead.

Life cycle 
The known lifespan of black roughneck monitor is about 10–20 years in captivity.

References

 (1992). Reproductive notes on the black roughneck monitor lizard (Varanus rudicollis Gray, 1845). VaraNews 3(2): 3.

Further reading
 Photos at Redtailboa.net
 Photos at Museumstuff.com
 Amer, Sayed A. M. and Yoshinori Kumazawa 2008. Timing of a mtDNA gene rearrangement and intercontinental dispersal of varanid lizards. Genes Genet. Syst. 83: 275–280
 Auliya, M. (2006). Taxonomy, Life History, and conservation of giant reptiles in west Kalimantan. Natur und Tier Verlag, Münster, 432 pp.
 Ávalos, J. de & Martínez Carrión, P. (1997). Warane Reptilia (Münster) 2 (5): 16-21
 Barbour, Thomas (1932). A new Bornean monitor Proceedings of the New England Zoological Club 13: 1-2
 Bayless, Mark K. 1997. The rough-neck Monitor lizard (Varanus rudicollis) Bulletin of the Chicago Herpetological Society 32 (12): 250-252
 Bennett, Daniel 1993. A review of some literature concerning the rough-necked monitor lizard Varanus rudicollis Reptilian 1 (9): 7-10
 Bennett, Daniel; Liat, Lim Boo 1995. A note on the distribution of Varanus dumerilii and V. rudicollis in Peninsular Malaysia. Malayan Nature Journal 49(2):113-116.
 Bong Heang, Kiew 1987. An annotated checklist of the herpetofauna of Ulu Endau, Johore, Malaysia Malayan Nature J. 41(2-3): 413-423.
 Boulenger, G.A. 1885. Catalogue of the lizards in the British Museum (Natural History). Vol. 2, Second edition. London, xiii+497 pp.
 De Rooij, N. de 1915. The Reptiles of the Indo-Australian Archipelago. I. Lacertilia, Chelonia, Emydosauria. Leiden (E. J. Brill), xiv + 384 pp.
Gaulke, Maren 1991. Systematic relationships of the Philippine water monitors as compared with Varanus s. salvator, with a discussion of dispersal routes Mertensiella 2: 154-167
 Gray, J. E. 1845. Catalogue of the specimens of lizards in the collection of the British Museum. Trustees of die British Museum/Edward Newman, London: xxvii + 289 pp.
 Horn,H.G. & Peters,G. 1982. Beiträge zur Biologie des Rauhnackenwarans, Varanus (Dendrovaranus) rudicollis Gray. Salamandra 18 (1/2): 29-40
 MANGILI (1962). Giard. zool. Roma, 4: 30
 Manthey, U. & Grossmann, W. (1997). Amphibien & Reptilien Südostasiens. Natur und Tier Verlag (Münster), 512 pp.
 Taylor, E.H. 1963. The lizards of Thailand. Univ. Kansas Sci. Bull. 44: 687-1077.
 Werner, F. 1900. Reptilien und Batrachier aus Sumatra, gesammelt Herrn. Gustav Schneider jr., im Jahre 1897-1898. Zool.Jahrb. (syst) 13:479-508

Varanus
Reptiles of Myanmar
Reptiles of Indonesia
Reptiles of Malaysia
Reptiles of Thailand
Reptiles of Southeast Asia
Reptiles described in 1845
Taxa named by John Edward Gray